Southern Savonia (formerly Mikkeli) was an electoral district represented in the Finnish Eduskunta (parliament). It covered the administrative region of Southern Savonia, with a population of 163,276. Southern Savonia elected six members of the Eduskunta. The electoral district was merged with Kymi to
form the new Southeastern Finland district.

The constituency is largely rural, and the only major city is Mikkeli. The traditionally dominant party in the parliamentary elections, the Centre Party, lost one seat in 2007 elections and is in even to National Coalition Party.

Members of parliament

2003–2007
 Jouni Backman (SDP)
 Katri Komi (Kesk.)
 Jari Leppä (Kesk.)
 Olli Nepponen (Kok.)
 Pekka Nousiainen (Kesk.)
 Arto Seppälä (SDP)

2007–2011
 Heli Järvinen (Vihr.)
 Katri Komi (Kesk.)
 Jari Leppä (Kesk.)
 Olli Nepponen (Kok.)
 Lenita Toivakka (Kok.)
 Pauliina Viitamies (SDP)

Election results

|}

|}

References

See also
 Electoral districts of Finland

Parliament of Finland electoral districts
South Savo